Madhavaram, is a village in Thavanampalle Taluk, Chittoor district in the state of Andhra Pradesh in India.

Demographics

References

External links 

Towns in Chittoor district